The 1938 Notre Dame Fighting Irish football team represented the University of Notre Dame during the 1938 college football season.

Notre Dame was awarded the Knute Rockne Memorial Trophy for the season, emblematic of their selection as national champions by the Dickinson System. The Irish topped the AP Poll until their loss to USC in their last game of the season.

Notre Dame does not claim a national championship for this season.

Schedule

References

Notre Dame
Notre Dame Fighting Irish football seasons
Notre Dame Fighting Irish football